Graham Wood (born 24 June 1936) is an Australian former field hockey player who competed in the 1960 Summer Olympics and in the 1964 Summer Olympics.

References

External links
 

1936 births
Living people
Australian male field hockey players
Olympic field hockey players of Australia
Field hockey players at the 1960 Summer Olympics
Field hockey players at the 1964 Summer Olympics
Olympic bronze medalists for Australia
Olympic medalists in field hockey
Medalists at the 1964 Summer Olympics